Valley Road Ground is an association football ground in Devonport, Tasmania. It is the home ground of Devonport City FC.
The ground is located at the point where the suburbs of Hillcrest, Highfields and Broadhurst meet.

References

Sports venues in Tasmania
Soccer venues in Tasmania